Cecilia Piccioni is an Italian diplomat and business consultant. She is advisor to the president of Fincantieri.

Career 
She graduated from Sapienza University of Rome. She worked at the World Bank. She was Chief of the Economic and Trade Office in the Czech Republic.  She was Chief of Staff to the Ambassador to the United States. She was counselor to the United Nations.

She was ambassador to Vietnam.

References 

Italian women ambassadors
Living people
Year of birth missing (living people)
Place of birth missing (living people)
Sapienza University of Rome alumni
Ambassadors of Italy to Vietnam
Italian diplomats
21st-century diplomats